Eugoa ellipsis is a moth of the family Erebidae. It is found in western Malaysia. The species is named for the elliptical shape on their wings.

Physical attributes
The males of Eugoa ellipsis have a wingspan of 14-15 millimeters. They have a pale brown forewing and weakly mottled dark brown color at the apex. Their wings have an almost elliptical black spot and the hindwings are a pale yellow. The females have a slightly smaller wingspans and solid pale brown colouring on their hindwings.

References

 Natural History Museum Lepidoptera generic names catalog

ellipsis
Moths described in 2008
Moths of Malaysia